The Denmark Masters is an international badminton tournament held in Denmark. This tournament has been an International Challenge level. Another tournament for higher level in the country is Denmark Open.

Previous winners

Performances by countries

References

External links
 Badminton Denmark

Badminton tournaments in Denmark